The 2007 V8 Supercar season featured the ninth V8 Supercar Championship Series which began on 1 March and concluded on 2 December. This championship consisted of 14 rounds covering all states and the Northern Territory of Australia as well as rounds in New Zealand and Bahrain. The series also carried the Australian Touring Car Championship title, which was awarded by CAMS for the 48th time in 2007.

The 2007 season was significant in that two new cars were being used by the teams. The Holden VE Commodore was a completely new car and the Ford BF Falcon consisted of several changes from the previous model. These cars debuted at the first round of the season at the Clipsal 500.

This season was also significant in that Seven Network broadcast the series for the first time since 1996, after Channel Ten and Fox Sports had rights to the series for the past ten years, and then revived in 2015.

Pre-season
The 2007 pre-season began with a number of driver and team changes which occurred during December 2006 and January 2007. The most important of the driver changes being Greg Murphy moving to Tasman Motorsport from Paul Weel Racing and Steven Richards changing not only teams, but also manufacturers by moving from the Holden-based Perkins Engineering to the Ford Performance Racing team.

A number of team changes also occurred during the off-season with Vodafone being the naming sponsor for Triple Eight Race Engineering and Jim Beam joining forces with the Dick Johnson Racing team.

Most of the team launches occurred during late January and early February with a few exceptions, including the launch of Mark Winterbottom's FPR car in early January. As well as the individual team launches, an official season launch was held in Sydney's Martin Place on 15 February.

A number of testing days were also held during the pre-season. These tests were conducted at the two race circuits used as test tracks, Queensland Raceway (Triple Eight Race Engineering, Dick Johnson Racing and WPS Racing) and Winton Raceway (most Victorian based teams including Holden Racing Team, Ford Performance Racing, HSV Dealer Team and Perkins Engineering). Both of these major tests were conducted on 19 February 2007.

One of the other major stories of the 2007 pre-season involved both of Holden's most supported teams, being the Holden Racing Team and the HSV Dealer Team. Both teams temporarily had their TEGA licences revoked meaning they would not be able to compete in the championship. This was due to issues relating to the ownership of both teams, where under V8 Supercar regulations, one person can only own one team.  Officially, Mark Skaife owned HRT and John Kelly (father of Todd and Rick) owned HSV Dealer Team, however the close relationship between the two teams and the presence of Tom Walkinshaw in both teams clouded the ownership of both teams. The teams had their licenses reinstated temporarily pending the presentation of documents proving the ownership of each team to TEGA. On 22 February 2007, the HSV Dealer Team produced the required documents and has been fully reinstated to the championship, and HRT was cleared to race on 27 February 2007 after satisfying TEGA that Mark Skaife was the true owner of the team.

Teams and drivers
The following teams and drivers contested the 2007 V8 Supercar Championship Series. Drivers are numbered as per the official 2007 entry list listed on the V8 Supercar website.

Race calendar

Changes

Driver changes
 Greg Murphy drove for Tasman Motorsport in 2007, with Paul Dumbrell replacing Murphy at Paul Weel Racing.
 On 1 January 2007, FPR announced Steven Richards as the team's second driver.
 Andrew Jones joined his father's and uncle's team and raced in the second Brad Jones Racing car.
 Perkins Engineering ran two V8 Supercar rookies, Shane Price and Jack Perkins in the 2007 season.
 Alan Gurr drove for Britek Motorsport as the teammate to Jason Bright.
 John Bowe drove for the Paul Cruikshank Racing team in his final year of V8 Supercar racing before retirement.
 Simon Wills took over the No. 14 Brad Jones Racing car from Brad Jones who retired from full-time driving following Round 3.
After Bathurst Fabian Coulthard was dropped from Paul Morris Motorsport older VZ Commodore and replaced with Ford Performance Racing's endurance co-driver, Owen Kelly.
Between the Bahrain and Symmons Plains rounds Jack Perkins stood aside from his Perkins Engineering VE Commodore because of diabetes. Recent Carrera Cup star and former Champ Car racer, Marcus Marshall returned to the team after racing in the No. 11 car at Sandown and Bathurst to complete the season.
Reigning Fujitsu Series champion Adam Macrow signed for Team Kiwi Racing for Adelaide, but was dropped after just one round for Paul Radisich who was back to full fitness after his crash at Bathurst. He competed in three rounds before leaving the team, and after not fielding a car for another three rounds the team replaced him with 17-year-old rookie Shane van Gisbergen at Oran Park.

Team changes
 Triple Eight Race Engineering had Vodafone as their main sponsor in 2007 replacing Betta Electrical.
 Orrcon returned to V8 Supercars as a sponsor for FPR.
 WPS Racing has undergone a complete re-structure of the team with Team Principal Mark Larkham leaving.
 At the DJR season launch on 6 February 2007, it was announced that Jim Beam would be the main naming sponsor of the team.
 Team Kiwi Racing swapped from running Holdens to Fords for 2007.

Rule Changes
 Points would only be awarded to the top 15 finishers.
 The top ten shootout would only be run at the endurance events.
 A single 45-minute qualifying session would be held in a fashion similar to Formula One, where all cars compete in the first 15 minutes. The quickest 20 would then complete in the second 15 minutes and the quickest 10 would complete in the final 15 minutes.
 No rounds would be dropped for the championship.
 There would be a greater spread of points between the point scoring positions.

Results and standings

Drivers Championship

Team Championship

 (s) denotes a single-car team.

References

External links
 Official V8 Supercar website
 2007 Racing Results Archive 
 2007 V8 Supercar images Retrieved from motorsport.com on 16 August 2008

Supercars Championship seasons
V8 Supercar Championship Series